Pygmaepterys alfredensis is a species of sea snail, a marine gastropod mollusk in the family Muricidae, the murex snails or rock snails.

Description

Distribution
This marine species occurs off Port Alfred, South Africa

References

External links
 Bartsch P. (1915). Report on the Turton Collection of South African marine mollusks, with additional notes on other South African shells contained in the United States National Museum. Bulletin. United States National Museum, 91: xii + 305 pp., 54 plates

Muricidae
Gastropods described in 1915